On 17 February 2021, a school pupil was killed and 27 others were abducted by armed men at around 3 am from their school in Kagara, Niger State, Nigeria. Three members of the school's staff and 12 of their relatives were also abducted. No one has claimed responsibility for the attack.

Raid
The gunmen raided the Government Science college in Kagara district of Niger state at around 2 am.

Government response

President Muhammadu Buhari of Nigeria ordered the police and the military to conduct a rescue operation.

While an investigation is ongoing, an anonymous security official told the Agence France-Presse that the attackers are believed to belong to a criminal gang.

On 19 February, the governor of the Niger State, Abubakar Sani-Bello, confirmed that the state government was in the final stages of negotiations with the bandits regarding the release of the aductees.

On 21 February, a military plane on the way to Minna to try to rescue the 42 hostages crashed, killing all the 7 people on board. The chief of air staff ordered an immediate investigation, to define if the crash was accidental or not.

On 24 February, the media reported that the kidnappers were negotiating with the parents of the abducted schoolboys for the payment of ransom for their release. A representative of the parents offered to pay the ransom of ₦2.7 million. The leader of the kidnappers, identified in the media as Dogo Gide, demanded the phone contacts of the parents so that he can negotiate with each of them directly. The state government of Niger insisted that it was still involved in negotiations with the kidnappers for an unconditional release of the abductees.

Release
On 27 February 2021, the government of Niger State announced that all the 42 people abducted from the Kagara school have been released by the bandits and received by the Niger state government.

See also
Jangebe kidnapping
Afaka kidnapping
Makurdi kidnapping

References

2021 murders in Nigeria
Attacks on schools in Nigeria
Child abduction in Nigeria
Crime in Niger State
February 2021 crimes in Africa
Kidnappings in Nigeria
Mass kidnappings of the 2020s
Violent non-state actor incidents in Nigeria